Basse Nding is a town in the Gambia. It is located in Fulladu East District in the Upper River Division. As of 2009, it has an estimated population of 466.

References

Populated places in the Gambia
Upper River Division